The following radio stations broadcast on FM frequency 96.3 MHz:

Argentina
 Aire Libre in Rio Grande, Tierra del Fuego
 Cristal in San Andrés de Giles, Buenos Aires
 del interior in Concepción, Tucuman
 del Sol in Merlo, San Luis
 El Cóndor in Ushuaia, Tierra del Fuego
 Glam in Salta, Salta
 Jai in Buenos Aires
 Jardín in Funes, Santa Fe
 Libres in Paso de los Libres, Corrientes
 Nitro in Tandil, Buenos Aires
 Omega in Zárate, Buenos Aires
 Radio Fe in Rosario, Santa Fe
 Radio María in Bragado, Buenos Aires
 Radio María in Frías, Santiago del Estero
 Restauración in Las Toscas, Santa Fe
 Sudeste in Justiniano Posse, Córdoba
 SUPeH in Ensenada, Buenos Aires
 Vida in Venado Tuerto, Santa Fe
 Viñas in General Alvear, Mendoza

Australia
 ABC Riverina in Young, New South Wales
 Coast FM 963 in Gosford, New South Wales
 Triple J in Port Macquarie, New South Wales
 96three in Geelong, Victoria

Canada (Channel 242)
 CBDQ-FM in Labrador City, Newfoundland and Labrador
 CBDT-FM in Deer Lake, Newfoundland and Labrador
 CBRB-FM in Banff, Alberta
 CFMK-FM in Kingston, Ontario
 CFMV-FM in Chandler, Quebec
 CFMZ-FM in Toronto, Ontario
 CFWD-FM in Saskatoon, Saskatchewan
 CIHO-FM in St. Hilarion, Quebec
 CINC-FM in Thompson, Manitoba
 CIOZ-FM in Marystown, Newfoundland and Labrador
 CJGY-FM in Grande Prairie, Alberta
 CJLS-FM-2 in Barrington, Nova Scotia
 CKKO-FM in Kelowna, British Columbia
 CKRA-FM in Edmonton, Alberta
 CKYK-FM-1 in Alma, Quebec
 VF2462 in Snow Lake, Manitoba

Ireland
Northern Sound in Monaghan

Malaysia
 Minnal FM in Selangor and Western Pahang

Mexico
XEJB-FM in Tlaquepaque, Jalisco
XHCR-FM in Morelia, Michoacán
XHEJE-FM in Dolores Hidalgo, Guanajuato
XHEMF-FM in Monclova, Coahuila
XHEOE-FM in Tapachula, Chiapas
XHPOZ-FM in Poza Rica, Veracruz
XHPUGC-FM in Úrsulo Galván-Cardel, Veracruz
XHSCO-FM in Salina Cruz, Oaxaca
XHSJS-FM in San José del Cabo, Baja California Sur
XHTOR-FM in Torreón, Coahuila
XHUP-FM in Tizimín, Yucatán
XHVS-FM in Hermosillo, Sonora
XHZAA-FM in Villa de Zaachila, Oaxaca

Philippines
DWRK in Manila
DYRK in Cebu City
DXFX in Davao City
DWCW in Legazpi City
DXWR in Zamboanga City

Singapore
96.3 Hao FM in Singapore

Sint Maarten (Dutch Caribbean)
PJD-6 in Philipsburg

Taiwan
Alian 96.3 (Indigenous Peoples Radio Station) in Taipei, Kaohsiung and Hualien
i like Radio (BCC Pop Network) in Kinmen

United Kingdom
 Radio Aire in Leeds
 Nation Radio Scotland in Renfrewshire
 Capital North West and Wales in North Wales Coast
Heart West in Bristol

United States (Channel 242)
  in Riley, Kansas
 KAJK in Susanville, California
 KARC-LP in Oroville, California
  in Hamilton, Montana
 KCAH-LP in Carthage, Missouri
 KCOT (FM) in Cotulla, Texas
  in Ingalls, Kansas
  in Eureka, California
 KGGB in Yorktown, Texas
 KGID in Giddings, Texas
  in El Paso, Texas
  in Blytheville, Arkansas
 KICL in Pleasantville, Iowa
 KJFK-FM in Llano, Texas
 KJHV-LP in Killeen, Texas
 KKJC-LP in Mcminnville, Oregon
 KKLZ in Las Vegas, Nevada
 KKOB-FM in Albuquerque, New Mexico
 KKWA in West Linn, Oregon
 KLLL-FM in Lubbock, Texas
 KMWA in Edina, Minnesota
 KNDS-LP in Fargo, North Dakota
 KOKO-LP in Hana, Hawaii
 KOUS-LP in Monroe, Louisiana
 KRCW (FM) in Royal City, Washington
 KRIM-LP in Payson, Arizona
 KRNQ in Keokuk, Iowa
  in Kailua, Hawaii
 KRWW-LP in Walla Walla, Washington
  in Billings, Montana
 KSCS in Fort Worth, Texas
 KSSB in Calipatria, California
  in Wickenburg, Arizona
 KTDR in Del Rio, Texas
  in Mena, Arkansas
  in Mariposa, California
 KWEW-LP in Wenatchee, Washington
  in Twentynine Palms, California
  in Houston, Alaska
  in Los Angeles, California
  in Provo, Utah
  in Derby, Kansas
  in Cawker City, Kansas
 KZMX-FM in Hot Springs, South Dakota
 KZXL in Hudson, Texas
  in Voorheesville, New York
  in Chicago, Illinois
 WBPU-LP in St. Petersburg, Florida
  in Murfreesboro, Tennessee
 WDVD in Detroit, Michigan
 WFUN-FM in Saint Louis, Missouri
 WFYX in Walpole, New Hampshire
  in Washington, District of Columbia
 WHYS-LP in Eau Claire, Wisconsin
 WILW-LP in Waupaca, Wisconsin
 WIVY in Morehead, Kentucky
  in Austin, Indiana
  in Seymour, Tennessee
  in Albany, Georgia
  in Gray, Maine
 WJOP-LP in Newburyport, Massachusetts
  in Jersey Shore, Pennsylvania
 WJXI-LP in Jacksonville, Alabama
 WKLA-FM in Ludington, Michigan
  in Aiken, South Carolina
  in Atlanta, Illinois
 WLOQ in Oil City, Pennsylvania
 WLVQ in Columbus, Ohio
  in Petoskey, Michigan
 WLYB in Livingston, Alabama
  in Sauk City, Wisconsin
 WMCV in Farmersburg, Indiana
 WOHM-LP in Charleston, South Carolina
 WOTR (FM) in Lost Creek, West Virginia
 WPKM-LP in Parkersburg, West Virginia
 WQRG-LP in Diamondhead, Mississippi
 WRBN in Clayton, Georgia
 WRHT in Morehead City, North Carolina
 WRNK-LP in Lanett, Alabama
  in Martinsville, Virginia
 WSCQ-LP in Sun City Center, Florida
  in Peshtigo, Wisconsin
 WTSW-LP in Manitowoc, Wisconsin
 WULB-LP in Long Boat Key, Florida
 WURK-LP in Tampa, Florida
  in Madison, Mississippi
 WXKE in Churubusco, Indiana
 WXKY in Stanford, Kentucky
 WXNY-FM in New York, New York
 WXSU-LP in Salisbury, Maryland
 WXWX in Marietta, Mississippi
 WYHX in Indianapolis, Indiana
 WYSG-LP in Hinckley, Minnesota

Vanuatu
 Buzz 96.3FM in Port Vila

References

Lists of radio stations by frequency